Henry J. Kaiser High School, or Kaiser High School, named for Henry J. Kaiser, may refer to:

Henry J. Kaiser High School (California)
Henry J. Kaiser High School (Hawaii)